Solanum acaule is a species of wild potato in the family Solanaceae, native to Peru, Bolivia, northern Chile, and northwestern Argentina. It is being extensively studied for its resistance to Phytophthora infestans (the cause of late potato blight), Potato leafroll virus, Potato virus X, Potato virus Y, potato cyst nematodes, and frost, in an effort to improve the domestic potato Solanum tuberosum.

References

acaule
Flora of Peru
Flora of Bolivia
Flora of northern Chile
Flora of Northwest Argentina
Plants described in 1912